Meadow Vista is a census-designated place (CDP) in Placer County, California, United States. It is part of the Sacramento–Arden-Arcade–Roseville Metropolitan Statistical Area. The population was 3,217 at the 2010 census, up from 3,096 at the 2000 census.

The California Office of Environmental Health Hazard Assessment has issued a safe eating advisory for any fish caught in Lake Combie due to elevated levels of mercury.

Geography
Meadow Vista is located at  (39.003795, -121.029242).

Demographics

2010
At the 2010 census Meadow Vista had a population of 3,217. The racial makeup of Meadow Vista was 3,017 (93.8%) White, 1 (0.0%) African American, 21 (0.7%) Native American, 35 (1.1%) Asian, 6 (0.2%) Pacific Islander, 34 (1.1%) from other races, and 103 (3.2%) from two or more races. Hispanic or Latino of any race were 171 people (5.3%).

The census reported that 3,201 people (99.5% of the population) lived in households, 16 (0.5%) lived in non-institutionalized group quarters, and no one was institutionalized.

There were 1,246 households, 374 (30.0%) had children under the age of 18 living in them, 807 (64.8%) were opposite-sex married couples living together, 96 (7.7%) had a female householder with no husband present, 51 (4.1%) had a male householder with no wife present.  There were 48 (3.9%) unmarried opposite-sex partnerships, and 7 (0.6%) same-sex married couples or partnerships. 233 households (18.7%) were one person and 118 (9.5%) had someone living alone who was 65 or older. The average household size was 2.57.  There were 954 families (76.6% of households); the average family size was 2.90.

The age distribution was 660 people (20.5%) under the age of 18, 219 people (6.8%) aged 18 to 24, 525 people (16.3%) aged 25 to 44, 1,205 people (37.5%) aged 45 to 64, and 608 people (18.9%) who were 65 or older.  The median age was 48.3 years. For every 100 females, there were 101.2 males.  For every 100 females age 18 and over, there were 97.9 males.

There were 1,339 housing units at an average density of 246.3 per square mile, of the occupied units 1,048 (84.1%) were owner-occupied and 198 (15.9%) were rented. The homeowner vacancy rate was 1.5%; the rental vacancy rate was 6.6%.  2,704 people (84.1% of the population) lived in owner-occupied housing units and 497 people (15.4%) lived in rental housing units.

2000
At the 2000 census there were 3,096 people, 1,140 households, and 918 families in the CDP. The racial makeup of the CDP was 96.25% White, 0.06% African American, 0.81% Native American, 0.39% Asian, 0.19% Pacific Islander, 0.26% from other races, and 2.03% from two or more races. Hispanic or Latino of any race were 3.62%.

Of the 1,140 households 33.0% had children under the age of 18 living with them, 68.9% were married couples living together, 8.2% had a female householder with no husband present, and 19.4% were non-families. 15.1% of households were one person and 7.4% were one person aged 65 or older.  The average household size was 2.72 and the average family size was 2.99.

The age distribution was 25.5% under the age of 18, 4.5% from 18 to 24, 24.1% from 25 to 44, 29.8% from 45 to 64, and 16.1% 65 or older.  The median age was 43 years. For every 100 females, there were 99.0 males.  For every 100 females age 18 and over, there were 94.8 males which made it to Mens Health's list of "Most Datable Places."

The median household income was $59,980 and the median family income  was $65,474. Males had a median income of $55,132 versus $28,682 for females. The per capita income for the CDP was $27,504.  None of the families and 1.5% of the population were living below the poverty line, including no under eighteens and none of those over 64. 2%

Annual community events 
Easter Egg Hunt
Mother's Day Breakfast
Pioneer Day (first Sunday in June)
Oktoberfest
Christmas in the Village

References

External links
Downtown Meadow Vista
Meadow Vista Merchants Association
Meadow Vista Protection
Meadow Vista Trails Association
Meadow Vista Municipal Advisory Council

Census-designated places in Placer County, California
Census-designated places in California